Liam Burt (born 1 February 1999) is a Scottish footballer who plays as a midfielder for Shamrock Rovers.

He made his first team debut for Rangers in March 2016, and also played on loan for Dumbarton and Alloa Athletic. He then moved to Celtic where he did not make a first team appearance before moving to Ireland with Bohemians in 2021. Burt represented Scotland at various youth levels up to under-21 level. He is also one of only six post-war players to have played for both halves of the Old Firm.

Club career
Burt played youth football at Celtic as a boy before being released and subsequently joining the Rangers Academy. He made his professional debut for the club aged 17 during a Scottish Championship match against Raith Rovers on 1 March 2016. A few days later, Burt signed a new two-year contract extension keeping him at Ibrox until May 2018.

He made his first appearance of the 2016–17 season, and his first Scottish top-flight appearance, as an injury time substitute on 10 December 2016 in a 2–0 home win against Heart of Midlothian. In January 2017, he was named as one of the Daily Record's and The Herald's Scottish football prospects for 2017.

Burt joined Scottish Championship side Dumbarton on a 28-day emergency loan in February 2018. He extended the deal in March 2018, scoring his first goal in senior football for the club in a 5-2 defeat to Falkirk. Burt was loaned to Championship club Alloa Athletic in August 2018. On 17 May 2019, it was announced that Burt would be released by Rangers.

In August 2019, he signed a two-year contract with Celtic. He left Celtic in 2020.

In February 2021, he was unveiled as a new signing for Bohemians ahead of the 2021 League of Ireland season. He scored 1 goal and set up Georgie Kelly for 2 goals to help Bohemians win 3-0 against Stjarnan in the  second round of the Europa Conference League qualifiers . Burt was named in the 2021 PFAI Team of the Year at the conclusion of the season.

On 2 December 2022, it was announced that Burt had signed for Bohemians arch rivals Shamrock Rovers ahead of the 2023 season.

International career
Burt has represented Scotland at various age levels. He captained Scotland at the 2016 UEFA European Under-17 Championship.

Selected for the Scotland under-21 squad in the 2018 Toulon Tournament, the team lost to Turkey in a penalty-out and finished fourth.

Career statistics

References

External links

1999 births
Living people
Scottish footballers
Association football midfielders
Rangers F.C. players
Scottish Professional Football League players
Scotland youth international footballers
Scotland under-21 international footballers
Dumbarton F.C. players
Alloa Athletic F.C. players
Celtic F.C. players
League of Ireland players
Bohemian F.C. players
Shamrock Rovers F.C. players
Footballers from Glasgow
Expatriate association footballers in the Republic of Ireland
Scottish expatriate footballers
Scottish expatriate sportspeople in Ireland